Nepenthes kitanglad is a tropical pitcher plant native to the Philippines. It is known only from Mount Kitanglad in Bukidnon Province, Mindanao, where it has been recorded as an epiphyte in mossy forest at 1800–2100 m altitude. This species belongs to the informal "N. alata group", which also includes N. alata, N. ceciliae, N. copelandii, N. extincta, N. graciliflora, N. hamiguitanensis, N. kurata, N. leyte, N. mindanaoensis, N. negros, N. ramos, N. saranganiensis, and N. ultra. These species are united by a number of morphological characters, including winged petioles, lids with basal ridges on the lower surface (often elaborated into appendages), and upper pitchers that are usually broadest near the base.

Nepenthes kitanglad was illustrated in the second volume of Stewart McPherson's 2009 work, Pitcher Plants of the Old World, where it was tentatively identified as N. saranganiensis. The specific epithet kitanglad refers to Mount Kitanglad, the only known locality of this species.

References

 Cheek, M. 2014. 12 new carnivorous plant species from the Philippines. Kew Science Blog, 20 January 2014. 
 Smith, L. 2014. Pitcher perfect - but carnivorous plants are at risk. The Independent, January 5, 2014. 

Carnivorous plants of Asia
kitanglad
Endemic flora of the Philippines
Flora of Mindanao
Plants described in 2013
Taxa named by Martin Cheek
Taxa named by Matthew Jebb